Conneely from (Mac Conghaile) or (Ó Conghaile), is an Irish family name. Frequent examples of the name can be found in the West of Ireland, particularly in the Connemara area of County Galway. A coastal village in County Galway is named Ballyconneely.

Overview

The original Irish language Gaelic version of the surname is Mac Conghaile, though sometimes rendered Ó Conghaile (due to an 18–19th century shift from Mac to O'). According to an entry in Irish Septs (David Austin Larkin): Mac Conghaile  -a Conmaicne Mara sept of Ballyconneely Townland, Parish and Bay, Roundstone, Connemara, Galway; Marshall of Uí Maine. The name Connemara comes from the tribe of Conmac, or Conmaicne, a warrior tribe which was sent to the area by the ancient Gaelic Kings of Connacht to ensure their hegemony. The branch of the tribe which went to the coastal area became known as Conmaicnemara, or 'the tribe of Cormac by the sea'. In medieval times Connemara was ruled by the O'Cadhlas and later by the 'ferocious' O'Flaherty's who built a series of castles along the coast. Conmaicne Mara is bordered on the west by Lough Corrib (Loch Oirbsen). The ancient territories along the Loch were Iar-Chonnacht, comprising Gnó Mor and Gnó Beag—with Conmaicne-Mara, now Conamara, on the west, and Uí Briúin Seóla on the east border, and towards the north-west, Dútha Seóigheach, the Joyce Country, between it and Loch Measca; and more to the north-east, Conmaicne Cúile Tola, the barony of Kilmaine, where the first great battle of Moytura was fought.

Two distinct Gaelic surnames Mac an Fhilidh and Mac Conghaile are sometimes translated as “Conneely” – in their earliest anglicised forms were almost indistinguishable. In the sixteenth century Fiants the former is found as MacAnellye and the latter as MacEnelly as well as MacNely and MacNeela. The modern form of Mac Conghaile is Conneely, which is essentially a Connacht name, every one of the 92 births registered in 1890 took place in Connacht, and 89 of these were in Co. Galway; and the birth indices for 1864 to 1866 show an almost identical preponderance of Co. Galway registrations. A century earlier it was numerous in south Mayo. Conneely represents an ancient west-Galway sept. Mac an Fhilidh is the name of an Ulster sept, numerically inferior to Mac Conghaile. The Four Masters describe Giollachriost Mac an Fhilidh, who died in 1509, as a learned poet. In A chorographical description of West or H-Iar Connaught (1684), Roderic O'Flaherty noted the name's connection to seals:"Seales.—The coasts of lar-Connaught and its islands abound with seals. The curious account given of these animals by Martin in his description of the western islands of Scotland...would, in most respects, answer for our western islands and coast; the only difference, perhaps, being, that with us seals are seldom slaughtered or used as food. See the affecting story of the domesticated seal, told by the ingenious author of 'Wild Sports of the West'. Many traditions, connecting these harmless animals with the marvellous, are related along our western shores. Among these there is one of a curious nature, viz., that at some distant period of time, several of the Clan Coneelys (Mac Conghaile), an old family of lar-Connaught, were, by 'Art magick,' metamorphosed into seals! In some places the story has its believers, who would no more kill a seal, or eat of a slaughtered one, than they would have a human Coneely. It is related as a fact, that this ridiculous story has caused several of the clan to change their name to Conolly."The principal location of both the O Cadhla and Mac Conneely families was the barony of Ballynahinch, Co. Galway, but the area comes under the control of the O'Flaherties. The Mac Conneely clan held the Errismore peninsula in Connemara running out to Slyne Head.

Ó Conaola (Ó Conghaola and sometimes also spelt ó Confhaola), are an entirely unrelated family from south Co. Galway -a toponymic, Hound of Gowla, of the Uí bhFhiachrach Aidne.

Often confused with:
Ó Conghaola - Conneally or Connelly - Uí bhFhiachrach Aidne
Ó Conghailaigh – (O) Connelly or Connolly – SE Co Galway – Síl nAmnchadha Uí Máine
Ó Conghalaigh – (O) Connolly – Co Fermanagh and Monaghan
Ó Coingheallaigh – Connolly – West Cork
Ó Congalaig – (O) Connolly – Co Dublin/Meath One of the Four Tribes of Tara.  Southern Uí Néill Sil Aeda Slaine.
Mac Conghaile or 'Ac Crollaigh – Crilly – (Sligo)

Possible early bearers of the surname include Muriertagh McInylley of Galway, "Inquisittio of the duties and rights of St. Nicholas his churche", A.D. 1609., a glower mentioned in the "Nomina Juratorum".

References

Surnames
Irish families
Surnames of Irish origin
People of Conmaicne Mara